John Fisher Wood,  (October 12, 1852 – March 14, 1899) was an Ontario businessman, lawyer and politician. He represented Brockville in the House of Commons of Canada as a Liberal-Conservative from 1882 to 1899.

He was born in Addison in Canada West in 1852 (some sources say 1850), the son of a Scottish immigrant. He taught school in Farmersville (Athens). He later studied law with Christopher Finlay Fraser in Brockville, was called to the bar in 1876 and set up practice in Brockville. In 1890, he was named Queen's Counsel. He served as solicitor for the United Counties of Leeds and Grenville and was also vice-president of the Brockville, Westport and Sault Ste. Marie Railway. In 1882, he was elected to the House of Commons. He was deputy speaker in the House from 1890 to 1891. From 1892 to 1895, he served as Controller of Inland Revenue; he served as Controller of Customs from 1895 to 1896. Controllers were government ministers. Wood was part of the "nest of traitors" who forced Mackenzie Bowell to resign as Prime Minister in 1896.

He died in Toronto in 1899 of heart failure.

Electoral record 

On Mr. Wood's nomination as Controller of Inland Revenue, 5 December 1892:

External links
 
 

1852 births
1899 deaths
Members of the House of Commons of Canada from Ontario
Liberal Party of Canada MPs
Members of the King's Privy Council for Canada
Canadian King's Counsel